Crewkerne railway station is located in Misterton in Somerset, England, and serves the area around the town of Crewkerne. The main building is listed Grade II and is surrounded by several other old railway buildings.

History

The station was opened on 19 July 1860 when the LSWR opened its Yeovil and Exeter Railway. The main building was designed by Sir William Tite and has been designated as a Grade II listed building. The office (converted to a cafe in late-2013) by the main road was used to operate the weighbridge. When it opened, a goods shed was built, now the site of a builder's yard. It can still be seen from the railway line today. A wooden signal box was erected in 1875 on the eastbound platform, just east of the main offices.

In 1923 the LSWR became part of the Southern Railway following the Railways Act 1921, and on 1 January 1948 the Southern Railway was itself nationalised to become the Southern Region of British Railways. A new signal box was built in 1960 a little to the east of the old one, which was then demolished, located between the old goods shed and the platforms.

In January 1963 all the lines in the area transferred to the Western Region and on 7 May 1967 the main line was rationalised.

Accidents and incidents 
On 24 April 1953 it was the scene of an accident when an axle of Merchant Navy Class 35020 Bibby Line broke while it was passing the station. This caused the platform canopy to be demolished.

Location
The station is about a mile southeast of Crewkerne on the A356 road, which crosses the platform and railway on a bridge. The entrance and platform are on the north side of the line, which is climbing westwards at 1 in 80 (1.25%) to the  Crewkerne Tunnel.

Services

See also
 Southern Railway routes west of Salisbury

References

Crewkerne
Railway stations in Somerset
Former London and South Western Railway stations
Railway stations in Great Britain opened in 1860
Railway stations served by South Western Railway
Grade II listed railway stations
Grade II listed buildings in South Somerset
William Tite railway stations
DfT Category E stations